Butterfly doors are a type of car door sometimes seen on high-performance cars. They are slightly different from scissor doors. While scissor doors move straight up via hinge points at the bottom of a car's A-pillar, butterfly doors move up and out via hinges along the A-pillar.  This makes for easier entry and exit, at the expense of requiring more clearance than needed for scissor doors.

Instances 

Butterfly doors were first seen in the Alfa Romeo 33 Stradale of 1967.

These doors were commonly used in Group C and IMSA GTP prototypes, as they preserved the aerodynamic shape of the canopy while allowing the driver to enter and exit the car more quickly than conventional and gullwing doors.

The Toyota Sera, made between 1990 and 1995, was a limited-release car designed exclusively for the Japanese market and the first mass-produced vehicle with butterfly doors. The Mercedes-Benz SLR McLaren is one of the few open-top cars to use butterfly wing doors. This is made possible by having hinge points along the side of the A-pillar instead of at the top.

Butterfly doors have been an adopted design of modern prototypes and supercars such as the McLaren F1, Toyota GT-One, Saleen S7, Enzo Ferrari (and its track day version, the FXX), Bentley Speed 8, Peugeot 908 HDi FAP, McLaren Senna, and Maserati MC20.

The McLaren 12C has a unique system wherein the butterfly doors do not use a top hinge. This allows the car and its convertible version to use frameless windows.

See also 

 Gull-wing door
 List of cars with non-standard door designs
 Scissor doors
 Sliding doors
 Suicide door
 Swan doors
 Vehicle canopy

References

External links 

Car doors